Songs of the Heart is the twelfth studio album by Christian alternative rock band Daniel Amos, released on BAI Records in 1995.

Concept
The album's concept is a musical journey down legendary Route 66 with the fictional couple Bud & Irma Akendorf. This concept was partially conceived after discovering an LP hanging on the wall of their rehearsal hall. The LP, which was released in the early 1960s and entitled Songs of the Heart, was by a singing gospel duo by the name of Bob and Elsa Beckendorf. The cover featured the couple pictured in Oak Creek Canyon. The band, inspired by the cover, decided to explore the lives of a fictional couple, which they named Bud and Irma Akendorf. The released cover of D.A.'s Songs of the Heart is an exact copy of the original LP by the Beckendorfs, with the artist name replaced. In an interesting turn of events, it turned out that the Beckendorfs were from Sedona, Arizona - which happened to be the real life home of Daniel Amos' founder Terry Scott Taylor's paternal grandparents.

Songs was later re-envisioned in the form of a three-CD book set, When Everyone Wore Hats. "Hats" included the entire original release plus the entire album rerecorded as an acoustic coffeehouse band, three bonus tracks, an interview about the album, new photos, liner notes and a short story by Taylor.

Track listing
 "Cant Take My Eyes Off Of You" (Gaudio/Crewe)
 "The Glory Road" (Words by Taylor, Music by Taylor/Flesch/Chandler/McTaggart)
 "Get Into the Bus, Aloha" (Words by Taylor, Music by Taylor/Flesch/Chandler/McTaggart)
 "Evangeline" (Words by Taylor, Music by Taylor/Flesch/Chandler/McTaggart)
 "Uneasy Lies the Head of the Confidence Man" (Words by Taylor, Music by Taylor/Flesch/Chandler/McTaggart)
 "The Organ Bar" (Words by Taylor, Music by Taylor/Flesch/Chandler/McTaggart)
 "Donna Nietche and her Super Race of Kick Boxing Uber Parrots" (Words by Taylor, Music by Taylor/Flesch/Chandler/McTaggart)
 "Our Night to Howl, Time to Go Dancing" (Words by Taylor, Music by Taylor/Flesch/Chandler/McTaggart)
 "Sins of the Fathers" (Words by Taylor, Music by Taylor/Flesch/Chandler/McTaggart)
 "Turn This Off" (Words by Taylor, Music by Taylor/Flesch/Chandler/McTaggart)
 "Loveland" (Words by Taylor, Music by Taylor/Flesch/Chandler/McTaggart)
 "When Everyone Wore Hats" (Words by Taylor, Music by Taylor/Flesch/Chandler/McTaggart)
 "My Hand to God" (Words by Taylor, Music by Taylor/Flesch/Chandler/McTaggart)

Personnel
 Jerry Chamberlain – guitars
 Tim Chandler – bass guitar, guitar, and trombone
 Greg Flesch – guitars, accordion, and organ
 Ed McTaggart – drums and percussion
 Terry Scott Taylor – rhythm guitars and lead vocals

Additional musicians
 Gene Eugene – keyboards

Production notes
 Executive Producers – Ojo Taylor and Gene Eugene
 Engineering – Terry Taylor and Gene Eugene
 Recorded at The Green Room, Huntington Beach, California
 Additional Recording at Desert Moon, Anaheim, California
 Mixed by Gene Eugene at the Green Room, and the Mixing Lab, Garden Grove, California. 
 Cover Photo – George Jordan.
 Art Direction and Layout – Ed McTaggart at the Color Edge, Costa Mesa, California and Tom Gulotta at Patton Brothers, San Diego, California.

References 

1995 albums
Concept albums
Daniel Amos albums